The Pidjanan languages are a subgroup of  Arawakan languages of northern South America.

Names
The term Pidjanan was coined by Sérgio Meira (2019) from Wapishana pidan ‘people’, as can be seen in the ethnonyms Wa-pishana and  Mao-pidian.

They are referred to as Mapidianic in Glottolog 4.3, and as Rio Branco by Nikulin & Carvalho (2019: 270).

Languages
According to Meira (2019), the Pidjanan languages are:

Mawayana (Mapidian, Maopidian), spoken by a dozen elderly people living in ethnic Waiwai and Tiriyó villages in Brazil and Suriname
Wapishana, spoken by over 6,000 people on both sides of the Guyana-Brazil border
? Atorad (Atorai)

Wapishana is more conservative, while Mawayana has innovated more from Proto-Pidjanan.

Ramirez's (2020) classification is:

Mawayana
Wapishanan
Wapishana, Atorai
Parawana, Aroaqui

Parawana and Aroaqui are closely related, and may be the same language.

Proto-language

Proto-Pidjanan has been reconstructed by Meira (2019).

Phonology
Proto-Pidjanan consonant phonemes:
{| class="wikitable"
| *p || *t ||  ||  || *k || *ʔ
|-
| *ɓ || *ɗ || *ɗʲ ||  ||  || 
|-
|  ||  || *ʦ,*ʧ ||  ||  || 
|-
|  || *s ||  || *ʐ ||  || 
|-
|  || *ɾ ||  || *ɽ ||  || 
|-
| *m || *n || *ɲ ||  ||  || 
|-
| *w ||  || (*j) ||  ||  || 
|}

Proto-Pidjanan vowel phonemes:
{| class="wikitable"
| *i || *ɨ || *u
|-
| *a ||  || 
|}

Morphology

Proto-Pidjanan person-marking prefixes:
{| class="wikitable"
! pronoun !! Proto-Pidjanan !! Mawayana !! Wapishana
|-
! 1S
| *nu- || n- || ũ-
|-
! 2S
| *pɨ- || ɨ- || pɨ-
|-
! 3S.MASC
| *(ɾ)ɨ- || ɾɨ- || ɨ-
|-
! 3S.FEM
| *(ɾ)u- || u- || u-
|-
! 3S.COREF
| *pa- || a- || pa-
|-
! 1P
| *wa- || wa- || wa-
|-
! 2P
| *ɨ- || ɨ- || pɨ-
|-
! 3P
| *nV- || na- || -ĩ
|}

Proto-Pidjanan person-marking suffixes:
{| class="wikitable"
! pronoun !! Proto-Pidjanan !! Mawayana !! Wapishana
|-
! 1S
| *-na || -na || -n, -na
|-
! 2S
| *-pV || -i || -p, -pa
|-
! 3S.MASC
| *-(ɽ)ɨ || -sɨ || -ʐɨ
|-
! 3S.FEM
| *-(ɽ)u ||  || -ʐu
|-
! 1P
| *-wi || -wi || 
|-
! 2P
| *-wiko || -wiko || 
|-
! 3P
| *-nu || -nu || -ʐɨ
|}

The functions of person markers (verbs in the -ɲɨ ‘realis’/‘present’ form).		

{| class="wikitable"
! personal marker function !! Proto-Pidjanan !! Mawayana !! Wapishana
|-
! A and O on transitives
| *nu-ɾuɁita-ɲɨ-ɽɨ ‘I hit him’ || n-ɾite-sɨ || ũ-ʐuɁita-nɨ-ʐɨ
|-
! SA on active intransitives
| *(ɾ)ɨ-siɁuka-ɲɨ ‘he walks’ || ɾɨ-suke || ɨ-ʧiɁika-n
|-
! SO on stative intransitives
| *wɨɽa(-ɲɨ)-ɽɨ ‘he is red’ || usa-sɨ || ɨ-wɨʐa(-n)
|-
! arguments on adpositions
| *(ɾ)ɨ-(i)tɨma ‘with him’ || ɾi-ʃima || ɨ-tɨma
|-
! possessors on nouns
| *nu-kɨnɨ ‘my song’ || n-kɨnɨ || ũ-kɨnɨ
|}

Nominal possession possessed and non-possessed forms.		

{| class="wikitable"
! possession marker !! Proto-Pidjanan !! Mawayana !! Wapishana
|-
! Possession marker
| *-nɨ (e.g., *wa-maɾija-nɨ ‘our knife’) || wa-maɾe-nɨ || wa-marija-n
|-
! Possession marker zero
| *(ɾ)ɨ-ʦaɓa ‘his seat’ || ɾiɁ-isaɓa || ɨ-taɓa
|-
! Non-possessed status
| *(i)ʦaɓa-i ‘seat’ || isaɓe || taɓa-i
|}

Lexicon
Unless indicated otherwise, the Mawayana and Wapishana data below is from Sérgio Meira's field notes, as cited in Meira (2019).

Meira's Mawayana data is from Marurunau, Guyana, and his Wapishana data is from Mapuera (a village that is mostly ethnic Waiwai), Nhamundá-Mapuera Indigenous Area, Pará State, Brazil. The other sources are:

Howard (1985-1986)
Carlin (2006)
Carlin (no date)
WLP (2000)
Silva, Silva & Oliveira (2013)
WLP (2001)

{| class="wikitable sortable"
! no. !! gloss !! Proto-Pidjanan !! Mawayana !! source (Mawayana) !! Wapishana !! source (Wapishana)
|-
| 1 || açaí palm || *waɓu || waɓu ||  || waɓu || WLP (2000)
|-
| 2 || acouchy || *aɗuɾi || aɗuɾi ||  || aɗuɾi || WLP (2000)
|-
| 3 || ant sp. || *kuki || kuki ‘saúva’ ||  || kuki ‘leafcutter ant’ || 
|-
| 4 || armadillo sp. || *mVɾuɾV ? || muɾuɾa ‘armadillo sp.’ ||  || maɾuɾu ‘giant armadillo’ || 
|-
| 5 || armpit || *kisapu || ɾɨ-keːsu ||  || ɨ-kiʃapu || 
|-
| 6 || as (essive) || *niː || ni ‘(change) into’ || Carlin (2006) || niː ‘future’, ‘essive’ || 
|-
| 7 || bacaba palm || *mapɨɽɨ || mɨsɨ ||  || mapɨʐa || WLP (2000)
|-
| 8 || banana || *sɨːɽɨ || sɨsɨɓa ||  || sɨːʐɨ || WLP (2000)
|-
| 9 || bat || *tamaɾɨwa || tamaɾɨwa ||  || tamaɾɨu || WLP (2000)
|-
| 10 || bathe (to) || *kawa || kaw-e || Carlin (no date) || ũ-kau-pa-n || Silva, Silva & Oliveira (2013)
|-
| 11 || beads || *kasuɾuː || kasuɾu ||  || kaʃuɾuː || WLP (2000)
|-
| 12 || bee / honey || *maːɓa || maɓa ||  || maːɓa || 
|-
| 13 || belt || *ɽantawɨ || ɨ-ɾantawɨɗa ||  || ʐaːɗawi || WLP (2000)
|-
| 14 || bird || *kutɨʔɨɽa || kuʧɨsa ||  || kutɨʔɨʐa || 
|-
| 15 || bird sp. 1 || *anaɾau || anaɾu ‘socó (heron sp.)’ ||  || anaɾau ‘marrecão (duck sp.)’ || Silva, Silva & Oliveira (2013)
|-
| 16 || bird sp. 2 || *ma(ɾ)atɨ || maːtɨ ‘jacu bird’ ||  || maɾatɨ ‘unidentified bird’ || WLP (2000)
|-
| 17 || bird sp. 3 || *kaɾapa || kaɾahpaɗa ‘arahka’ || Carlin (no date) || kaɾapa ‘aracuã’ || WLP (2001)
|-
| 18 || bite (to) || *a(ɾ)uːta || ɾ-autʃa-na ‘he bit me’ || Carlin (2006) || aɾuːta-n || Silva, Silva & Oliveira (2013)
|-
| 19 || black || *puɗɨ || uɗɨ-ɾe ||  || puɗɨ-ʔu || WLP (2000)
|-
| 20 || blow (to) || *puːta || ɾ-uʧ-e || Howard (1985-1986) || ɨ-puːta-n || WLP (2000)
|-
| 21 || Brazil nut || *minaɨ || minɨ ‘peanut’, ‘Brazil nut’ ||  || minaɨ || WLP (2000)
|-
| 22 || breast || *ɗɨɲɨ || ɾiː-ɗɨ ||  || ɨ-ɗɨnɨ || WLP (2000)
|-
| 23 || buriti palm || *ɗʲɨwɨ || jɨwɨ ‘buriti’ ||  || ɗʲɨwɨ ‘ité fruit’ || WLP (2000)
|-
| 24 || burn (to) || *kaʔawa || kaw-e ‘burn (intr.)’ ||  || kaʔawa-n ‘burn (intr.)’ || WLP (2000)
|-
| 25 || butterfly || *ʦamaʦama || samasama ||  || tamtam || WLP (2000)
|-
| 26 || caiman sp. || *atuɾɨ || aʧuɾɨ ||  || atuɾɨ ‘small caiman’ || 
|-
| 27 || cajá fruit || *ɽuːɓa || ɾuɓa ||  || ʐuːp || Silva, Silva & Oliveira (2013)
|-
| 28 || canoe || *kanawa || kanawa ||  || kanawa || WLP (2000)
|-
| 29 || capybara || *kasu || kasu ||  || kaʃu || WLP (2000)
|-
| 30 || child || *kuɾai- || kuɾenu ||  || kuɾaiɗaunaː || 
|-
| 31 || child / egg || *ɗaɲi || ɾiː-ɗe, ɾiː-ɗesi ||  || ɨ-ɗani || 
|-
| 32 || cicada || *wamu || womu ||  || wamu || Silva, Silva & Oliveira (2013)
|-
| 33 || claw / nail || *ɓaɗʲi || ɾɨ-ɓaɗʲi ||  || ɨ-ɓaʐi || WLP (2000)
|-
| 34 || coati || *kuaɗjɨ || kaɗɨ ||  || kuaʧi || WLP (2000)
|-
| 35 || cockroach || *ɓasaɾawa || ɓasaɾawa ||  || ɓaʃaɾau || WLP (2000)
|-
| 36 || comb || *mauCi || mutiɓa ||  || maudi || WLP (2000)
|-
| 37 || corn || *maɽiki || maɾiki ||  || maʐiki || WLP (2000)
|-
| 38 || curassow || *pawisi || awisi ||  || pawiʃi || Silva, Silva & Oliveira (2013)
|-
| 39 || deer sp. || *kusaɾa || kusaɾa ‘deer, small’ ||  || kuʃaɾa ‘deer, bush’ || 
|-
| 40 || die (to) || *mawa- || maw-ɗa ||  || mawa-ka, mau-ka-n || WLP (2000)
|-
| 41 || dry || *maːɾa || maɾa-ɓa-sɨ || Howard (1985-1986) || maːɾa-n || WLP (2000)
|-
| 42 || eagle sp. || *kuku- || kukuɗa ‘hawk sp.’ ||  || kukui ‘harpy eagle’ || WLP (2000)
|-
| 43 || earthworm || *paɽaɾu || aɾaɾu ||  || paʐaɾu || WLP (2000)
|-
| 44 || eat (to) || *ɲika || ɾ-ĩka ||  || pɨ-nika || WLP (2000)
|-
| 45 || elbow || *patuɾi || ɾiː-ɸaʧuɾi ||  || ɨ-patuɾi || WLP (2000)
|-
| 46 || electric eel || *kaʦumi || katumi ||  || kasumi || WLP (2000)
|-
| 47 || fan || *awaɾiba || wiɾiɓe, n-wiɾiɓa ||  || awaɾiɓa-i || WLP (2000)
|-
| 48 || father || *Ca || ɾɨ-ta ||  || ɨ-daɾɨ || 
|-
| 49 || fire || *tikaɽi || ʃikaɾi ||  || tikaʐi || 
|-
| 50 || fish || *kupaɨ || kuwɨ ||  || kupaɨ || 
|-
| 51 || fish sp. 1 || *ɽiːta || ɾiʧe ‘traíra’ ||  || ʐiːtaɓa ‘fish sp.’ || WLP (2000)
|-
| 52 || fish sp. 2 || *aʧimaɾa || atimaɾa ‘trairão’ ||  || aʧimaɾa ‘fish sp.’ || WLP (2000)
|-
| 53 || fish sp. 3 || *kuɾɨɽɨ || kuɾɨsɨ ‘surubim’ ||  || kuɾɨʐɨ ‘surubim’ || WLP (2000)
|-
| 54 || flat area || *ɗaːɾa || ɗaɾa ‘grass(land)’ ||  || ɗaːɾa ‘a flat barrier’ || WLP (2000)
|-
| 55 || flower || *sɨwɨ || ɾɨ-sɨwɨ || Howard (1985-1986) || ɨ-suːsu || WLP (2000)
|-
| 56 || from || *(ɾ)iki || aʔu-ɾiki ‘from there’ || Carlin (2006) || iki || WLP (2000)
|-
| 57 || fruit || *(a)ka || ɾɨ-ka ||  || ɨ-aka || WLP (2000)
|-
| 58 || give (to) || *taː || ɾɨ-ʧ-e-sɨ || Howard (1985-1986) || ɨ-taː-n || 
|-
| 59 || grandmother || *(ʃ)Vːɽu ? || wa-ʃuɾu ||  || ɨʔ- ɨːʐu || WLP (2000)
|-
| 60 || hair || *iCi || ɾ-iʃiɾama ||  || ɨ-iʃi || WLP (2000)
|-
| 61 || hand || *kaʔɨ || ɾɨ-kɨɓa ||  || ɨ-kaʔɨ || 
|-
| 62 || heart || *ɲɨkɨɲɨja || ɾiːʔ-ĩkĩjã ||  || ɨ-ɲɨkɨnɨː || WLP (2000)
|-
| 63 || hit (to) || *ɽuʔita || ɾita-ka-nu ‘hit each other’ || Howard (1985-1986) || ɨ-ʐuʔita-n ‘he hit’ || WLP (2000)
|-
| 64 || house || *paɲi- || aĩku ||  || paniɓa ‘outside’, paniːnum ‘entrance, door, doorway’ || WLP (2000)
|-
| 65 || I || *nnu || nnu ||  || ũɡaɾɨ || WLP (2000)
|-
| 66 || if / when || *ana || ana || Carlin (2006) || ana || WLP (2000)
|-
| 67 || iguana || *suwana || suwanaɗa ||  || suwan || WLP (2000)
|-
| 68 || inajá palm || *puk- ? || ukatɨ ‘inajá’ ||  || pukuɾidi ‘kokorite palm’ || WLP (2000)
|-
| 69 || ingá tree || *kuɾami || kuɾami ‘ingá’ ||  || kuɾami ‘ingá do mato’ || Silva, Silva & Oliveira (2013)
|-
| 70 || intestines || *ukuɾi(ɾi) || ɾ-ukuɾiɾi ||  || ɨ-ukuɾi || 
|-
| 71 || knee || *kuɗuɾu || ɾiː-kuɗuɾu ||  || ɨ-kuɗuɾu || 
|-
| 72 || knife || *maɾija || maɾe ||  || maɾiː, ɨ-maɾija-n || 
|-
| 73 || language || *paɾa || ɾiːʔ-aɾa ||  || ɨ-paɾada-n || WLP (2000)
|-
| 74 || leaf || *anaɓa || ɾ-anaɓa ||  || ɨ-anaɓa || WLP (2000)
|-
| 75 || left hand || *asVɓa- || asuɓaɗʲanu ‘right hand’ || Howard (1985-1986) || aʃaɓaɾu || Silva, Silva & Oliveira (2013)
|-
| 76 || leg / shin || *(i)taɓa || ɾiː-ʃaɓa ‘leg, shin’ ||  || ɨ-taɓaʔu ‘leg’ || 
|-
| 77 || louse || *nnai || nni ||  || nai || 
|-
| 78 || macaw sp. || *(k)aɽaɾu || aɾaɾu ‘yellow macaw’ ||  || kaʐaɾɨ ‘yellow macaw’ || WLP (2000)
|-
| 79 || manioc || *kaɲɨɽɨ || kaːsɨ, kãːsɨ ||  || kanɨʐɨ || WLP (2000)
|-
| 80 || manioc press || *(ɲ)iːɽu- ? || isune ||  || niːʐu || WLP (2000)
|-
| 81 || meat food || *wɨɲɨ || wĩ, ɾɨ-wɨnɨ || Howard (1985-1986) || wɨnɨ-i, ɨ-wɨnɨ || WLP (2000)
|-
| 82 || medicine || *-ʦaɾa || ɾɨ-ɨtaɾa ||  || ɨ-kasaɾa || WLP (2000)
|-
| 83 || monkey sp. 1 || *ɾuːmu || ɾumu ‘spider monkey’ ||  || ɾuːmi ‘spider monkey’ || 
|-
| 84 || monkey sp. 2 || *ʦɨɓɨɾɨ || tɨɓɨɾɨ ‘howler monkey’ ||  || sɨɓɨɾɨ ‘howler monkey’ || 
|-
| 85 || monkey sp. 3 || *puwatɨ || otʃɨ ‘capuchin monkey’ ||  || puwatɨ ‘capuchin monkey’ || 
|-
| 86 || monkey sp. 4 || *(i)ʧaɨmaː || ʧɨma ‘tamarin monkey’ ||  || ʧaɨmaː ‘black tamarin’ || Silva, Silva & Oliveira (2013)
|-
| 87 || moon || *kaɨɽɨ || kɨsɨ ||  || kaɨʐɨ || 
|-
| 88 || mosquito sp. || *miʦu || mitu ||  || misu || 
|-
| 89 || mother || *Caɾu || ɾiː-taɾu ||  || ɨ-daɾu || 
|-
| 90 || murumuru || *ɓɨɾɨ || ɓɨɾɨ ‘murumuru palm’ ||  || ɓɨɾɨ ‘palm (unidentified)’ || WLP (2000)
|-
| 91 || nose || *(i)ɗiɓa || ɾɨ-tiɓa ||  || ɨ-iɗiɓa || 
|-
| 92 || old man || *tɨɲa(u)ɾɨnau || tauɾɨnu ||  || tɨnaɾɨnau || 
|-
| 93 || opossum sp. || *waːʦa || wata ‘opossum sp.’ ||  || waːsa ‘opossum, woolly’ || WLP (2000)
|-
| 94 || other || *ɓaʔuɾVnu || ɓuɾunu || Howard (1985-1986) || ɓaʔuɾan, ɓaʔuɾanɨ-aɓa || WLP (2000)
|-
| 95 || papaya || *maʔapaja || maɓaja ||  || maʔapai || WLP (2000)
|-
| 96 || parrot sp. || *waɾu || waɾu ||  || waɾu || WLP (2000)
|-
| 97 || partner || *miɲa- ? || ɾiː-meːɾawa ||  || ɨ-minaɨɗaʔɨ || WLP (2000)
|-
| 98 || path || *ɗɨnapu || ɗɨnu ||  || ɗɨnapu || WLP (2000)
|-
| 99 || payment || *winipa || ɾi-wina ||  || ɨ-winipa || WLP (2000)
|-
| 100 || peccary sp. 1 || *ɓakɨɾa || ɓakɨɾa ‘collared peccary’ ||  || ɓakɨɾɨ ‘collared peccary’ || 
|-
| 101 || peccary sp. 2 || *Ciʧa || ɾita ‘white-lipped peccary’ ||  || ɓiʧa, ɓiʧi ‘white-lipped peccary’ || 
|-
| 102 || person || *piɗaɲa || ɗʲe, ɗʲeː ||  || piɗan, piɗana-n || WLP (2000)
|-
| 103 || pet || *ɨɽa || ɾ-ɨsa || Howard (1985-1986) || ɨʔ-ɨʐa || WLP (2000)
|-
| 104 || red || *wɨɽa || usa-sɨ ||  || wɨʐa-ʔu || WLP (2000)
|-
| 105 || rib || *aɾaɗɨ(ɗɨ) || ɾiːʔ-aɾaɗɨ ||  || ɨ-aɾaɗɨɗɨ, ɨ-aɾaɗɨʔɨ || 
|-
| 106 || rope || *iɲuʔi || jũwi ||  || inuʔi, inuɓi ‘hammock rope’ || WLP (2000)
|-
| 107 || salt || *ɗɨwɨ || ɗɨwɨ ||  || ɗɨwɨ || WLP (2000)
|-
| 108 || sand || *kaːtɨ || kaʧɨ || Howard (1985-1986) || kaːtɨ || WLP (2000)
|-
| 109 || seat || *(i)ʦaba || isaɓe, ɾiːʔ-isaɓa ||  || taɓa-i, ɨ-taɓa || WLP (2000)
|-
| 110 || see (to) || *tVka || ɾi-ʧika ||  || ɨ- tɨka-pa-n || 
|-
| 111 || shaman || *maɾɨnawɨ || maɾɨnawɨ ||  || maɾɨnau || WLP (2000)
|-
| 112 || shoulder / arm || *(i)ʦawaɗa || ɾiː-sawaɗa ‘arm’ ||  || ɨ- tawaɗa ‘shoulder’ || 
|-
| 113 || sieve || *manaɾɨ || manaɾɨ ||  || manaɾɨ ‘cassava sifter’ || WLP (2000)
|-
| 114 || skin / bark || *maɗa || ɾiː-maɗa ||  || ɨ-maɗa || WLP (2000)
|-
| 115 || sky || *Vkaɽi || ɨkaɾi ||  || aukaʐi || 
|-
| 116 || sloth sp. || *awɨ || awɨ ||  || awɨ || Silva, Silva & Oliveira (2013)
|-
| 117 || small || *suɗi ? || ʃiɗʲiɗʲa-ɾe ‘small, narrow’ || Howard (1985-1986) || suɗi || 
|-
| 118 || smoke || *isa- || ise-sɨ || Howard (1985-1986) || iʃa-n ‘cloud’ || 
|-
| 119 || song || *kɨnɨ || kɨni, ɾiː-kɨnɨ ||  || kɨnɨ-i, ɨ-kɨnɨ || W5
|-
| 120 || spider || *(s)uːwa || uwaɓa ||  || suːwa || 
|-
| 121 || stone || *kɨɓa || kɨɓa ||  || kɨɓa || 
|-
| 122 || sun || *kamuː || kamu ||  || kamuː || 
|-
| 123 || sweet potato || *kaCɨɽɨː || katɨ ||  || kaːʐɨː || WLP (2000)
|-
| 124 || tapir || *kuɗui || kuɗi ||  || kuɗui || 
|-
| 125 || tell (to) || *kɨwaːɗa || ɾɨ-kɨwaɗ-e-sɨ ‘he tells it’ ||  || kuwaːɗa-n ‘tell’ || WLP (2000)
|-
| 126 || termite || *maɽi || maɾiɓa ||  || maʐi || WLP (2000)
|-
| 127 || thin || *miCa- || metaɗa || Howard (1985-1986) || miɗaʔɨ || WLP (2000)
|-
| 128 || thornbush || *Cawɨɽɨ || tawɨsɨ ||  || kawɨʐɨ || WLP (2000)
|-
| 129 || throat || *kuɾukuɾu || ɾiː-kuɾukuɾu ||  || kuɾukuɾu-n ‘larynx’ || WLP (2000)
|-
| 130 || tick || *kuCVCVɓa || kunuriɓa ||  || kuɾinaɓa || 
|-
| 131 || timbó liana || *uku || uku ‘timbó liana’ ||  || uku ‘poison for fish’ || 
|-
| 132 || tinamou sp. || *mami || mami ‘tinamou sp.’ ||  || mami ‘bird sp.’ || Silva, Silva & Oliveira (2013)
|-
| 133 || toad sp. || *tuɾuɾuɓa || tʃuɾuɾuɓa ||  || tuɾuɾuɓa || WLP (2000)
|-
| 134 || tobacco || *ʦuma || tuma ||  || suːma || 
|-
| 135 || tongue || *ɲiɲuɓa || ɾɨ-jũjũɓa ||  || ɨ-ninuɓa || 
|-
| 136 || tortoise || *wɨɾV || uːɾɨ ||  || wɨɾaɗa || 
|-
| 137 || toucan sp. || *ʧaːkui || takwe ‘toucan sp.’ ||  || ʧaːkui ‘toucan sp.’ || 
|-
| 138 || tree / wood || *atamɨna || aʧamɨna ||  || atamɨn, atamɨnɨ || 
|-
| 139 || tree trunk || *kaɗɨ- || ɾɨ-kaɗɨ ||  || ɨ-kaɗɨnaː || WLP (2000)
|-
| 140 || trumpeter || *namVʧɨ || namɨtɨ ‘jacamim’ ||  || namaʧi ‘gray trumpeter’ || WLP (2000)
|-
| 141 || tucumã palm || *sawaɾa || sawaɾa ‘tucumã’ ||  || ʃawaɾaɨ ‘unidentified palm’ || WLP (2000)
|-
| 142 || vulture sp. || *kuɾumu || kuɾumu ‘vulture sp.’ ||  || kuɾɨm ‘bird sp.’ || WLP (2000)
|-
| 143 || walk || *siʔuka ? || ɾu-suka ||  || tʃiʔika-n || WLP (2000)
|-
| 144 || water || *wɨnɨ || unɨ, uːnɨ ||  || wɨnɨ || 
|-
| 145 || we || *waɨnau || weʔawɨnu ||  || waɨnau || WLP (2000)
|-
| 146 || what / who || *ka || ka ||  || kan, kanum || WLP (2000)
|-
| 147 || wind || *awaɾɨ || awaɾɨ ||  || awaɾɨ || WLP (2000)
|-
| 148 || with || *(i)tɨma || ri-ʃima ||  || ɨ-tɨma || WLP (2000)
|-
| 149 || woman || *ɽɨna || ɾɨnaɾu ||  || ʐɨna || 
|}

Vocabulary
100-word Swadesh list for Mawayana and Wapishana:

{| class="wikitable sortable"
! no. !! gloss !! Mawayana !! Wapishana
|-
| 1 || I || nnu || ũgaɾɨ
|-
| 2 || you (sg.) || i || pɨgaɾɨ
|-
| 3 || we (incl.) || weʔawɨnu || waɨnau
|-
| 4 || this || tiʔa || wɨɾɨʔɨ
|-
| 5 || that || aɾu || wɨɾɨʔɨ
|-
| 6 || who || ka || kanum
|-
| 7 || what || ka || kanum
|-
| 8 || not || ʧika, ma-sɨ || aunaː
|-
| 9 || all || meke-nu || ipai
|-
| 10 || many || ɾea-nu || iɾiɓa-ʔu
|-
| 11 || one || aɓõ(i)ja || ɓaɨɗaʔapa
|-
| 12 || two || aɗaka || ɗʲaʔɨtam
|-
| 13 || big || tawɾe-ɾe || ɨɗaɾɨ-ʔu
|-
| 14 || long || kɨʔu-ɾe || ʐaʔaɓaʔɨ
|-
| 15 || small || ʃiɗʲiɗʲa-ɾe || soɗi
|-
| 16 || woman || ɾɨnaɾu || ʐɨna
|-
| 17 || man || asɨna || ɗaunajuɾa
|-
| 18 || person || ɗʲe || piɗan
|-
| 19 || fish || kuwɨ || kupaɨ
|-
| 20 || bird || kuʧɨsa || kutɨʔɨʐa
|-
| 21 || dog || jimaɗa || aɾimaɾaka
|-
| 22 || louse || Nni || nai
|-
| 23 || tree || itiɓaɾi || atamɨn
|-
| 24 || seed || ɾɨ-su || ɨ-ɨːɗa
|-
| 25 || leaf || ɾ-anaɓa || ɨ-anaɓa
|-
| 26 || root || ɾɨ-ʧaɓaɗa || ɨ-iʃitaɓaʔu
|-
| 27 || bark || ɾiː-maɗa || ɨ-maɗa
|-
| 28 || skin || ɾiː-maɗa || ɨ-maɗa
|-
| 29 || meat || wĩ || wɨnɨ-i
|-
| 30 || blood || ɾiː-sɨkɨwɨɗa || iʐa-i
|-
| 31 || bone || ɾiː-kɨɓɨ || ɨ-niwaʔɨʐi
|-
| 32 || grease || ɾiti || kiwin-iː
|-
| 33 || egg || ɾiː-ɗe || ɨ-ɗani
|-
| 34 || horn || ɾ-õʃĩɗa || ɨ-uʐuː
|-
| 35 || tail || ɾɨ-tuna || ɗʲɨu
|-
| 36 || feather || ɾ-iʃiɓa || kɨtɨɓa
|-
| 37 || hair || ɾ-iʃiɾama || ɨ-iʃi
|-
| 38 || head || ɾɨ-kɨwɨ || ɨ-ʐuwaɨ
|-
| 39 || ear || ɾiː-siɗʲa || ɨ-tain
|-
| 40 || eye || ɾ-oso || ɨ-awɨn
|-
| 41 || nose || ɾɨ-tiɓa || ɨ-iɗiɓa
|-
| 42 || mouth || ɾ-umiɗʲa || ɨ-ɗaku
|-
| 43 || tooth || ɾɨ-ʔu || ɨ-ɨɗaku
|-
| 44 || tongue || ɾ-ĩjũjũɓa || ɨ-ninuɓa
|-
| 45 || claw || ɾɨ-ɓaɗʲi || ɨ-ɓaʐi
|-
| 46 || foot || ɾɨ-ɾuɓa || ɨ-kidiɓa
|-
| 47 || knee || ɾiː-kuɗuɾu || ɨ-kuɗuɾu
|-
| 48 || hand || ɾɨ-kɨɓa || ɨ-kaʔɨ
|-
| 49 || belly || ɾ-ijika || ɨ-tuɓa
|-
| 50 || neck || ɾiː-ɾewɨ || ɨ-kanaɨ
|-
| 51 || breast || ɾiː-ɗɨ || ɨ-ɗɨnɨ
|-
| 52 || heart || ɾiːʔ-ĩkĩjã || ɨ-ɲɨkɨnɨː
|-
| 53 || liver || ɾɨ-ʃuɓa || ɨ-kɨɓaː
|-
| 54 || drink || kuɾa-sɨ || ɨ-tɨʐa-n
|-
| 55 || eat || ɾ-ĩka || ɨ-nɨka-n
|-
| 56 || bite || awʧa-sɨ || ɨ-aɾuta-n
|-
| 57 || see || ɾɨ-ʧika-sɨ || ɨ-tɨka-pa-n
|-
| 58 || hear || ɾɨ-kɨmɨd-e-sɨ || ɨ-abata-n
|-
| 59 || know || ɾɨ-ɾud-e-sɨ || ɨ-aitapa-n
|-
| 60 || sleep || a-tũwa || ɨ-daʔawɨ-n
|-
| 61 || die || mawɗa || ɨ-mau-ka-n
|-
| 62 || kill || ɾu-kuɗa || ɨ-ʐuwia-n
|-
| 63 || swim || ʧokwa-sɨ || ɨ-nɨota-n
|-
| 64 || fly || maɾ-e-sɨ || ɨ-ʐɨʔɨta-n
|-
| 65 || walk || ɾu-suka || ɨ-ʧiʔika-n
|-
| 66 || come || jaɗ-e || ɨ-waʔati-n
|-
| 67 || lie || ʧukuɗ-e-sɨ || ɨ-waʃatina-n
|-
| 68 || sit || itaɗ-e-sɨ || ɨ-sakanata-n
|-
| 69 || stand || kaʧɨmɨʧ-e-sɨ || ɨ-kadiʃita-n
|-
| 70 || give || rɨ-ʧ-e-sɨ || ɨ-taː-n
|-
| 71 || say || ɾɨ-m-e || ɨ-kia-n
|-
| 72 || sun || kamu || kamuː
|-
| 73 || moon || kɨsɨ || kaɨʐɨ
|-
| 74 || star || siwaɾu || wiʐi
|-
| 75 || water || u(ː)nɨ || wɨnɨ
|-
| 76 || rain || u(ː)nɨ || wɨnɨ
|-
| 77 || stone || kɨɓa || kɨɓa
|-
| 78 || sand || kaʧɨ || kaːtɨ
|-
| 79 || earth || ʃimaɾi || imiʔi
|-
| 80 || cloud || ekaɾi ɾita-ɾe || iʃaʔɨʐi
|-
| 81 || smoke || isesɨ || tikaʐi ʃan
|-
| 82 || fire || ʃikaɾi || tikaʐi
|-
| 83 || ash || ʃikaɾuɓa || paɾitiɓi
|-
| 84 || burn (intr.) || kaw-e || ɨ-kaʔawa-n
|-
| 85 || path || ɗɨnu || ɗɨnapu
|-
| 86 || mountain || ɾɨnɨ || miɗɨkɨu
|-
| 87 || red || usa-sɨ || wɨʐa-ʔu
|-
| 88 || green || ʧɨha-ɾe || kuʔuɾi-ʔu
|-
| 89 || yellow || ʧɨha-ɾe || upaɾita-ʔu
|-
| 90 || white || kɨse-ɾe || ɓaɾaka-ʔu
|-
| 91 || black || uɗɨ-ɾe || puɗɨ-ʔu
|-
| 92 || night || tɨɓokoʔa || aiwakaʔan
|-
| 93 || hot || ɗʲiʧa-sɨ || wi(ː)ʧa-ʔu
|-
| 94 || cold || ɾika-ɾe || waɗiɗi-ʔu
|-
| 95 || full || etaɗa || paida-n
|-
| 96 || new || wiʧakaɾi || paʔina-ʔu
|-
| 97 || good || wĩja-ɾe || kaiman
|-
| 98 || round || ajɓɨɓɨ-ɾe || kaɗaʐaɗa-ʔu
|-
| 99 || dry || maɾaɓa-sɨ || maːɾa-n
|-
| 100 || name || ɾɨ-ɾenka || ɨʔ-ɨː
|}

Bibliography
Melville, C.; Tracy, F. V.; Williams, O. Wapishana. Intercontinental Dictionary Series. 2007. Accessed on Oct. 30, 2007.
SB (Surinaams Bijbelgenootschap / Suriname Bible Society). Kaimana’o Tominkaru Paradan (The New Testament). Paramaribo, Georgetown: Suriname Bible Society and Guyana Bible Society, 2012.

References

Arawakan languages
Languages of Guyana
Languages of Suriname
Languages of Brazil